Karolína Kosinová (born 21 May 1998) is a Czech ice hockey player for HC Příbram and the Czech national team.

She represented the Czech Republic at the 2019 IIHF Women's World Championship.

References

External links

1998 births
Living people
Ball hockey players
Czech women's ice hockey defencemen
Ice hockey people from Brno
Universiade medalists in ice hockey
Medalists at the 2023 Winter World University Games
Universiade bronze medalists for the Czech Republic